Bhagyadevatha is an Indian television series which launched on Mazhavil Manorama channel starring actress Sreelaya.

Plot  
Bhagyadevata tells the story of a girl named Bhagyalekshmi who has some special power of sixth sense. She is the adopted daughter of Kaliyarmadam kovilakam which is a famous family in their locality. Bhagyalekshmi is the best friend of Shivakami who the only daughter of Kaliyarmadam Parameshwari. After facing so many problems  Bhagyalekshmi gets a better life in the end.

Cast

Main 
 Sreelaya as Bhagyalekshmi
 Lekshmi Priya as Shivakami

Recurring 

 Thara Kalyan as Kaliyar Madom Parameshwari
 Sadiq
 Murali Krishnand as Krishnan Unni
 Nikhil as Balaraman
 Bipin Jose as Simon
 Zeenath as Elsa
 Valsala Menon as Rahel Amma
 Chandran as Peter Mash
 Jismy

References 

2013 Indian television series debuts
Malayalam-language television shows
2014 Indian television series endings
Mazhavil Manorama original programming